Vincent "Vince" Dominic Cicciarelli (born February 23, 1993) is an American soccer player.

Career

College
Cicciarelli played college soccer at the University of Notre Dame between 2012 and 2015 (red-shirting his freshman season in 2011), upon graduation in May 2015, he transferred to Saint Louis University for his fifth year of NCAA eligibility to pursue his MBA.

Cicciarelli also played for Premier Development League side Des Moines Menace in 2015, appearing in 8 games and scoring 5 goals.

Professional
Cicciarelli was selected in the third round (60th overall) of the 2016 MLS SuperDraft by the Columbus Crew. Released by the Crew during training camp without a contract, he then signed with USL side Saint Louis FC on March 3, 2016.

Cicciarelli made his debut with the club on March 30, appearing as a substitute in a match against LA Galaxy II. Three days later, again entering as a substitute during a match against the Orange County Blues, he registered his first professional goals, scoring twice in the second half; he was named the USL Player of the Week for his performance, becoming the first Saint Louis FC player to win the award. The following week, Cicciarelli scored in a 2–2 draw against Oklahoma City Energy, and was again named to the USL Team of the Week.

References

External links
Notre Dame bio
St. Louis University bio

1993 births
Living people
American soccer players
Association football forwards
Columbus Crew draft picks
Des Moines Menace players
Notre Dame Fighting Irish men's soccer players
Saint Louis Billikens men's soccer players
Saint Louis FC players
Soccer players from Illinois
Sportspeople from Peoria, Illinois
USL League Two players